Robert Turner King (born 14 July 1824 at Melton Mowbray, Leicestershire; died 12 May 1884 at Bootle, Lancashire) was an English amateur cricketer who played first-class cricket from 1846 to 1851.

Robert Turner King was educated at Oakham and Emmanuel College, Cambridge. This fast-medium roundarm bowler was mainly associated with Cambridge University and Marylebone Cricket Club (MCC), where he made 45 known appearances in first-class matches.  He played for the Gentlemen in the Gentlemen v Players series. He was "far-famed for his wonderful catches as a fielder at 'point.'"

King subsequently became a clergyman.

References

External links
 CricketArchive profile

Further reading
 H S Altham, A History of Cricket, Volume 1 (to 1914), George Allen & Unwin, 1962
 Arthur Haygarth, Scores & Biographies, Volumes 1-11 (1744–1870), Lillywhite, 1862-72

1824 births
1884 deaths
Alumni of Emmanuel College, Cambridge
English cricketers
English cricketers of 1826 to 1863
Marylebone Cricket Club cricketers
Cambridge University cricketers
Gentlemen cricketers
Gentlemen of England cricketers
Oxford and Cambridge Universities cricketers
Cambridge Town Club cricketers
North v South cricketers
All-England Eleven cricketers